Neil Michael Hagerty & the Howling Hex is an album by Neil Michael Hagerty.  It is the last album to be released under Hagerty's name; subsequent releases have been credited to The Howling Hex.  The album was released as a CD and double LP by Drag City in 2003.

Track listing
All songs written by Hagerty except where noted

Side one
"Firebase Ripcord" – 3:29
"Out of Reach" – 2:27
"Watching the Sands" – 2:23
"Gray" (Hagerty/Carol Lewis) – 1:56
"Rockslide (live)" – 6:04

Side two
"Greasy Saint" – 2:07
"Fat Street" – 2:52
"Clermont Heights" (Tim Barnes/Dan Brown/Hagerty) – 1:05
"I'm Your Son" – 3:05
"Creature Catcher (live)" – 7:28

Side three
"The Brooklyn Battery" – 2:03
"Carrier Dog" – 1:54
"Witch" (Hagerty/Phil Jenks) – 1:29
"I Remember Old John Brown" – 1:24
"She Drove a Rusted Sled" (Barnes/Brown/Hagerty) – 2:18
"White Sex" – 1:43
"Rckslyd Var." – 1:10
"Car Commercial" – 4:10

Side four
"AEP 1" – 1:41
"AEP 11" – 2:33
"Energy Plan" (Barnes/Brown/Hagerty) – 12:19

References

2003 albums
Drag City (record label) albums